The  Church of the White Bird (or Shiri Chena Church) was a Christian church in eastern Rhodesia (now Zimbabwe) that combined Christian religious beliefs with traditional Shona symbolism.

The Church of the White Bird was founded by Matthew Chigaga Zwimba, the son of a government-appointed chief of the Zwimba Reserve.  After years of difficulty with the white authorities (including being dismissed as a teacher in 1907), Zwimba founded the church in 1915 by physically occupying the existing Methodist station.  The Church of the White Bird was the first of a number of independent Shona churches.

External links
Matthew Zwimba biography

Rhodesia
Christian organizations established in 1915
African initiated churches
Christian denominations established in the 20th century